Wunderlichia is a genus of Brazilian trees in the family Asteraceae.

The genus contains several species of wind-pollinated trees, all endemic to Brazil.

 Species
 Wunderlichia azulensis Maguire & G.M.Barroso - Espirito Santo, Minas Gerais
 Wunderlichia bahiensis Maguire & G.M.Barroso- Bahia
 Wunderlichia cruelsiana Taub. - Tocantins, Bahia, Goiás
 Wunderlichia insignis Baill. - Rio de Janeiro
 Wunderlichia mirabilis Riedel ex Baker	- Espirito Santo, Minas Gerais, Bahia, São Paulo, D.F., Mato Grosso, Goiás
 Wunderlichia senaeii Glaz. ex Maguire & G.M.Barroso - Minas Gerais

References

Asteraceae genera
Wunderlichioideae
Endemic flora of Brazil